Lamb in His Bosom is a 1933 novel by Caroline Miller. It won the Pulitzer Prize for the Novel in 1934. It also won the Prix Femina in 1934 and became an immediate best-seller. Many names and historical parts of this book were contributed by William Avery McIntosh, of Mt. Pleasant, Wayne County, Georgia. His only child, a daughter, is still living in Northeast Georgia.

The story of a poor white woman growing to maturity in the Pre-Civil War rural south. The personal and extended family struggles, and ups and downs of day-to-day living, in the rural culture.  The author mastered the ability to express her thoughts with rural charm, naivety, with the vernacular dialect and cultural biases intact.  This novel might be considered as an addition to contemporary Women's Studies courses, as reminder of how far women have progressed in 150 years.

References

External links
 First edition of "Lamb in his Bosom"

1933 American novels
Pulitzer Prize for the Novel-winning works
Novels set in Georgia (U.S. state)
Wayne County, Georgia
Harper & Brothers books
1933 debut novels